Samphanthawong Museum is a museum in Samphanthawong District, Bangkok, Thailand. The museum focuses on the history of early Chinese immigrants in the Samphanthawong district.

External links
 Article about the museum

Museums in Bangkok
Local museums in Thailand
Samphanthawong district